Dattenberg is a municipality in the district of Neuwied, in Rhineland-Palatinate, Germany.

References

External links

Official website

Neuwied (district)